Bettws Rugby Football Club is a Welsh rugby union club based in Bettws, Newport in South Wales. It currently plays in the Welsh Rugby Union Division Five East.

References

Facebook Bettws Rfc

Welsh rugby union teams
Rugby union clubs in Newport, Wales